The Bloomfield Public Schools are a comprehensive community public school district that serves students in pre-kindergarten through twelfth grade from Bloomfield, in Essex County, New Jersey, United States.

As of the 2021–22 school year, the district, comprised of 11 schools, had an enrollment of 6,191 students and 538.5 classroom teachers (on an FTE basis), for a student–teacher ratio of 11.5:1.

The district is classified by the New Jersey Department of Education as being in District Factor Group "DE", the fifth-highest of eight groupings. District Factor Groups organize districts statewide to allow comparison by common socioeconomic characteristics of the local districts. From lowest socioeconomic status to highest, the categories are A, B, CD, DE, FG, GH, I and J.

Awards and recognition
During the 2007-08 school year, Oak View Elementary School was recognized with the National Blue Ribbon School Award of Excellence by the United States Department of Education, the highest award an American school can receive.

Schools
Schools in the district (with 2021–22 enrollment data from the National Center for Education Statistics) are:

Early childhood 
Early Childhood Center at Forest Glen (165 students; in grade PreK)
Linda Colucci, Principal
Elementary schools
Berkeley Elementary School (446; K-6)
Dr. Natashia Baxter, Principal
Brookdale Elementary School (320; K-6)
Lauren Barton, Principal
Carteret Elementary School (375; K-6)
John Baltz, Principal
Demarest Elementary School (480; K-6)
Michael Sullivan, Principal
Fairview Elementary School (452; PreK-6)
Ginamarie Mignone, Principal
Franklin Elementary School (343; K-6)
Marianne Abbasso, Principal
Oak View Elementary School (314; PreK-6)
Mary DiTrani, Principal
Watsessing Elementary School (270; K-6)
Dr. Gina Rosamilia, Principal

Middle school
Bloomfield Middle School (971; 7-8)
Alla Vayda-Manzo, Principal

High school 
Bloomfield High School / Bridges Academy (1,986; 9-12)
Christopher Jennings, Principal

Administration
Core members of the district's administration are:
Salvatore Goncalves, Superintendent of Schools
Hwey-Hwey "Vicky" Guo, Business Administrator / Board Secretary

Board of Education 
The district's board of education is comprised of nine members who set policy and oversee the fiscal and educational operation of the district through its administration. As a Type II school district, the board's trustees are elected directly by voters to serve three-year terms of office on a staggered basis, with three seats up for election each year held (since 2013) as part of the November general election. The board appoints a superintendent to oversee the district's day-to-day operations and a business administrator to supervise the business functions of the district.

In November 2015, Kent Weisert was elected to the school board according to preliminary results even though he died two weeks before the election results came in.

References

External links 
Bloomfield Public Schools
 
School Data for the Bloomfield Public Schools, National Center for Education Statistics

Bloomfield, New Jersey
New Jersey District Factor Group DE
School districts in Essex County, New Jersey